Leonard Messado (1915 – 1980) was a Jamaican cricketer. He played in two first-class matches for the Jamaican cricket team in 1938/39.

See also
 List of Jamaican representative cricketers

References

External links
 

1915 births
1980 deaths
Jamaican cricketers
Jamaica cricketers
Place of birth missing